Hermine Huntgeburth (born 13 November 1957) is a German film director. She is best known for her 2005 film The White Masai.

Selected filmography
The Terrible Threesome (1991)
Gefährliche Freundin (1996, TV film)
 (1998)
The Coq Is Dead (2000, TV film)
Romeo (2001, TV film)
 (2002)
The White Masai (2005)
Effi Briest (2009)
 (2010, TV film)
 (2011)
 (2012)
 (2012, TV film)
 (2014, TV film)
 (2020)

References

External links 

1957 births
Living people
Mass media people from North Rhine-Westphalia
People from Paderborn